Pinchbeck may refer to:

Places
Pinchbeck, Lincolnshire, England, UK
Pinchbeck Engine, a drainage museum nearby

People
Christopher Pinchbeck (c.1670 – 1732), English watchmaker who developed an eponymous alloy; or his son  also named Christopher (1710–1783)
Daniel Pinchbeck, American author
Ivy Pinchbeck, economic historian
William Pinchbeck, American pioneer

Other
Pinchbeck (alloy), an alloy made of copper and zinc

See also

 
 Pinchback
 Pinch (disambiguation)
 Back (disambiguation)